Thirukkuvalai is a village situated in Nagapattinam district of Indian state of Tamil Nadu. 

The village is known for the Brahmapureeswarar Temple. It is the birthplace of former chief minister of the state, M. Karunanidhi where his ancestral home functions as a library.

Demographics 
According to the latest 2011 Indian census, the village has a population of 4255 divided in 1161 families of which male population is 2135 and female with 2120, 10.62 percent of population is under six years of age. The literacy rate of 80.94 percent and the sex ratio 993 are almost same as that of the state level which is 80.09 percent and 996. Literacy stands at 88.21 percent for men and 73.74 percent for women.
This village have Anna university, this is the only government engineering college of this district

References 

Nagapattinam district
Villages in Nagapattinam district